The 1998 NCAA Division I men's basketball tournament involved 64 schools playing in single-elimination play to determine the national champion of men's  NCAA Division I college basketball. It began on March 12, 1998, and ended with the championship game on March 30 at the Alamodome in San Antonio. A total of 63 games were played.

The Final Four consisted of Kentucky, making their third consecutive Final Four, Stanford, making their first appearance since their initial Final Four run in 1942, Utah, making their fourth Final Four and first since 1966, and North Carolina, who returned for a fourteenth overall time and third in four seasons.

Kentucky won the national title, its second in three seasons and seventh overall, by defeating Utah 78–69 in the championship game.

Jeff Sheppard of Kentucky was named the tournament's Most Outstanding Player. Kentucky came back from double-digit deficits in each of its last three games in the tournament, including a 17-point second half comeback against the Duke Blue Devils, leading to the school's fans dubbing the team the "Comeback Cats". This was Kentucky's third straight championship game appearance.

Bryce Drew led the 13th-seeded Valparaiso Crusaders to the Sweet Sixteen, including a memorable play that remains part of March Madness lore.

For the second consecutive season, a #14 seed advanced from the first round; Richmond, coached by John Beilein, upset South Carolina. 

For the second time in three years, a top seeded team failed to advance to the Sweet Sixteen. That distinction belonged to Midwest Region #1 seed Kansas, who was defeated by #8 seed Rhode Island.

Schedule and venues

The following are the sites that were selected to host each round of the 1998 tournament:

First and Second Rounds
March 12 and 14
East Region
 Hartford Civic Center, Hartford, Connecticut (Host: University of Connecticut)
 MCI Center, Washington, D.C. (Host: George Mason University)
West Region
 BSU Pavilion, Boise, Idaho (Host: Boise State University)
 ARCO Arena, Sacramento, California (Host: University of the Pacific)
March 13 and 15
Midwest Region
 United Center, Chicago, Illinois (Host: Big Ten Conference)
 Myriad Convention Center, Oklahoma City, Oklahoma (Host: University of Oklahoma)
South Region
 Georgia Dome, Atlanta, Georgia (Host: Georgia Institute of Technology)
 Rupp Arena, Lexington, Kentucky (Host: University of Kentucky)

Regional semifinals and finals (Sweet Sixteen and Elite Eight)
March 19 and 21
East Regional, Greensboro Coliseum, Greensboro, North Carolina (Host: Atlantic Coast Conference)
West Regional, Arrowhead Pond of Anaheim, Anaheim, California (Host: Big West Conference)
March 20 and 22
Midwest Regional, Kiel Center, St. Louis, Missouri (Host: Missouri Valley Conference)
South Regional, Tropicana Field, St. Petersburg, Florida (Host: University of South Florida)

National semifinals and championship (Final Four and championship)
March 28 and 30
Alamodome, San Antonio, Texas (Host: University of Texas at San Antonio)

San Antonio became the 26th host city, and the Alamodome the 31st host venue, for the Final Four. The 1998 tournament saw two new cities and two new venues. For the first time ever, the tournament was held within Washington's city limits, at the new MCI Center (now Capital One Arena) downtown; all previous games in the region had been either at Cole Field House on the University of Maryland campus or at the USAir Arena in suburban Landover. The tournament also came to Orange County, California for the first time, at the Arrowhead Pond, home to the NHL's Mighty Ducks. The tournament returned to St. Louis in 1998, playing at the Kiel Center, successor venue to both Kiel Auditorium (whose site it was built on) and the St. Louis Arena. And for the first time in 45 years, the tournament was held within Chicago city limits at the United Center, successor venue to the old Chicago Stadium, which was across the street from the new venue. The tournament also marked the last appearance of the Myriad Convention Center in Oklahoma City, with future games held at the Paycom Arena directly across the street.

Teams

Bids by conference

Bracket
* – Denotes overtime period

East Regional – Greensboro, North Carolina

Regional Final Summary

West Regional – Anaheim, California

Regional Final Summary

South Regional – St. Petersburg, Florida

Regional Final Summary

Midwest Regional – St. Louis, Missouri

Regional Final Summary

Final Four – San Antonio, Texas

Game Summaries

National Championship

Announcers
Jim Nantz and Billy Packer – First & Second Round at Atlanta, Georgia; South Regional at St. Petersburg, Florida; Final Four at San Antonio, Texas
Sean McDonough and Bill Raftery – First & Second Round at Washington, D.C.; East Regional at Greensboro, North Carolina
Gus Johnson and Jon Sundvold – First & Second Round at Hartford, Connecticut; West Regional at Anaheim, California
Tim Brando and Al McGuire – First & Second Round at Lexington, Kentucky; Midwest Regional at St. Louis, Missouri
Ted Robinson and Rolando Blackman – First & Second Round at Oklahoma City, Oklahoma
Jim Durham and Greg Kelser – First & Second Round at Boise, Idaho
Tim Ryan and Dan Bonner – First & Second Round at Chicago, Illinois
Ian Eagle and Jim Spanarkel – First & Second Round at Sacramento, California

See also
 1998 NCAA Division II men's basketball tournament
 1998 NCAA Division III men's basketball tournament
 1998 NCAA Division I women's basketball tournament
 1998 NCAA Division II women's basketball tournament
 1998 NCAA Division III women's basketball tournament
 1998 National Invitation Tournament
 1998 Women's National Invitation Tournament
 1998 NAIA Division I men's basketball tournament
 1998 NAIA Division II men's basketball tournament
 1998 NAIA Division I women's basketball tournament
 1998 NAIA Division II women's basketball tournament

References

NCAA Division I men's basketball tournament
Ncaa
NCAA Division I men's basketball tournament
NCAA Division I men's basketball tournament
Basketball in San Antonio